Senator Bateman may refer to:

Ephraim Bateman (1780–1829), U.S. Senator from New Jersey from 1826 to 1829
Fred W. Bateman (1916–1999), Virginia State Senate
Herbert H. Bateman (1928–2000), Virginia State Senate
Kip Bateman (born 1957), New Jersey State Senate
Raymond Bateman (1927–2016), New Jersey State Senate